Stockholm County is a county or län (in Swedish) on the Baltic Sea coast of Sweden. It borders Uppsala County and Södermanland County. It also borders Mälaren and the Baltic Sea. The city of Stockholm is the capital of Sweden. Stockholm County is divided by the historic provinces of Uppland (Roslagen) and Södermanland (Södertörn). More than one fifth of the Swedish population lives in the county. Stockholm County is also one of the statistical riksområden (national areas) according to NUTS:SE, Nomenclature of Territorial Units for Statistics within the EU. With more than two million inhabitants, Stockholm is the most densely populated county of Sweden.

History

Stockholm County was established in 1714. The City of Stockholm then constituted its own administrative entity under the Governor of Stockholm and was not part of Stockholm County. Though outside Stockholm County, the City of Stockholm was its seat.

On 1 January 1968, Stockholm County was united with the City of Stockholm. At the same time, the borders were redrawn in other directions too; Upplands-Bro Municipality was transferred from Uppsala County and a large part of the modern day Östhammar Municipality was transferred to Uppsala County.

Geography

Lakes
 Flemingsbergsviken
 Karptjärn
 Långsjön, Hanveden
 Lundsjön–Dammsjön
 Måsnaren
 Ramsjön, Haninge kommun

Economy 
The Gross domestic product (GDP) of the region was 145.6 billion € in 2018, accounting for 30.9% of Swedish economic output. GDP per capita adjusted for purchasing power was 49,500 € or 164% of the EU27 average in the same year. The GDP per employee was 132% of the EU average.

Heraldry 
Arms granted in 1968. The arms for the County of Stockholm is a combination of the arms of Uppland, Södermanland and the City of Stockholm. When it is shown with a royal crown it represents the County Administrative Board.

Riksdag
The table details all Riksdag elections held in Stockholm County since the unicameral era began in 1970. Stockholm and the wider county have separate parliamentary constituencies. The latter is named after the county as a whole.

Municipalities 
The county of Stockholm comprises 26 political municipalities (kommuner):

Localities by population (2017) 
All 132 built-up places (tätorter) in the county are shown below. These refer to contiguous settlements and may straddle municipal (and occasionally county) boundaries.

Demographics

Foreign background 
SCB have collected statistics on backgrounds of residents since 2002. These tables consist of all who have two foreign-born parents or are born abroad themselves. The chart lists election years and the last year on record alone.

County Administrative Board 
Prior to 1968 the County of Stockholm did not include the City of Stockholm. The City was instead under the Office of the Governor of Stockholm, and the County included the surrounding countryside. The County had its separate Governor of Stockholm County.

The main aim of the County Administrative Board is to fulfill the goals set in national politics by the Riksdag and the Government, to coordinate the interests of the county, to promote the development of the county, to establish regional goals and safeguard the due process of law in the handling of each case. The County Administrative Board is a Government Agency headed by a governor.

See List of Stockholm Governors.

County council
The local administration of the county is under Stockholm County Council (Stockholms läns landsting). Its main responsibilities are for the public healthcare system and public transport.

The county council has 149 members elected by proportional representation through elections held in conjunction with the general elections every four years. The county council itself elects the county's executive committee.

The president of the committee also holds the title Commissioner of Finance. The  commissioner is Catharina Elmsäter-Svärd, of the Moderate Party. The members of the executive committee (landstingsstyrelsen) represent both the political majority and the opposition, with responsibility for implementing policies approved by the county council.

Elections
Stockholm County contains two multi-seat constituencies for county council elections. Stockholm Municipality makes up the first constituency while the second makes up the rest of the county.

Council elections 2002-2018

Hospitals
The county council operates most of the hospitals in the county, some of the major facilities are:

Karolinska University Hospital. The hospital contains two major facilities; one in Solna and one in Huddinge (since the merger with Huddinge University Hospital in 2004).
Södersjukhuset
Danderyd Hospital
Södertälje Hospital
Norrtälje Hospital
S:t Erik Ocular Clinic

Public transport
The county council is responsible for the public transport in Stockholm. The main organizers of the transportation system are two publicly owned companies. Storstockholms Lokaltrafik, SL, handles the bus, tram and train services while the boat traffic is handled by Waxholmsbolaget. The operation and maintenance of the public transport systems is delegated by the companies to several contractors.

The county is also responsible for paratransit services and Närtrafiken, a number of share taxi routes.

Culture and education
Besides the health and transportation services, the county council operates Stockholm County Museum, and two agricultural high schools at Berga and Säbyholm.

See also
 Stockholm (National Area)
 List of metropolitan areas in Sweden
 Largest metropolitan areas in the Nordic countries
 List of European regions by GDP

References and notes

External links

Stockholm County Administrative Board
Stockholm County Council
Stockholm Regional Association of Local Authorities 

 
Counties of Sweden
Geography of Stockholm
Government of Stockholm
NUTS 2 statistical regions of the European Union
1714 establishments in Sweden
States and territories established in 1714